The 1998 NCAA Division I Cross Country Championships were the 60th annual NCAA Men's Division I Cross Country Championship and the 18th annual NCAA Women's Division I Cross Country Championship to determine the team and individual national champions of NCAA Division I men's and women's collegiate cross country running in the United States. In all, four different titles were contested: men's and women's individual and team championships.

Held on November 23, 1998, the combined meet was hosted by the University of Kansas at Rim Rock Farm in Lawrence, Kansas. The distance for the men's race was 10 kilometers (6.21 miles) while the distance for the women's race was 5 kilometers (3.11 miles). 

The men's team championship was won by Arkansas (97 points), the Razorbacks' ninth overall. The women's team championship was won by Villanova (106 points), the Wildcats' seventh (and first since winning six consecutive between 1989 and 1994).

The two individual champions were, for the men, Adam Goucher (Colorado, 29:26) and, for the women, Katie McGregor (Michigan, 16:47).

Men's title
Distance: 10,000 meters

Men's Team Result (Top 10)

Men's Individual Result (Top 10)

Women's title
Distance: 5,000 meters

Women's Team Result (Top 10)

Women's Individual Result (Top 10)

References
 

NCAA Cross Country Championships
NCAA Division I Cross Country Championships
NCAA Division I Cross Country Championships
NCAA Division I Cross Country Championships
Lawrence, Kansas
Track and field in Kansas
University of Kansas
College sports in Kansas
Sports competitions in Kansas